Rhapsody is a Canadian music television series which aired on CBC Television from 1958 to 1959.

Premise
This series featured three to four staged sequences of music and dance, led by Ivan Romanoff's orchestra.

Scheduling
This half-hour series was broadcast in the first season on Tuesdays at 10:00 p.m. (Eastern time) from 22 July to 28 October 1958. The second season aired on Sunday evenings from 28 June to 27 September 1959 at 7:30 p.m. except the final two episodes which were rescheduled to 10:00 p.m.

References

External links
 

CBC Television original programming
1950s Canadian music television series
1958 Canadian television series debuts
1959 Canadian television series endings
Black-and-white Canadian television shows